Man, Myth & Magic is a fantasy role-playing game originally published by Yaquinto Publications in 1982, now published by Precis Intermedia.

Gameplay
Man, Myth & Magic is set in historical times on Earth, drawing on myths and legends from 4000 BCE to 400 CE. 

Character generation is determined randomly, including nationality, race, and character traits (strength, speed, endurance, intelligence, courage, and skill). Because of the randomness of nationality and race, which can range from ancient Britain to the Far East, there is little chance that a party of adventurers will represent a historically accurate mix of characters. Combat and skill checks are made using percentile dice generating a number between 1 and 100. 

The game components are: a box containing three rulebooks ("Basic Rules", "Advanced Rules", and "Adventures", which contained suggested scenarios), dice, blank character sheets, and adventure maps.

Reception 
Reviewers were not impressed with Man, Myth & Magic.

Tony Watson in the October–November 1982 issue of Different Worlds #25 commented that the game offers nothing new and makes many historical errors in terms of the Emperors of Rome and the coinage used. He suggested that the game could be improved by the inclusion of a bibliography.
 
In the February 1983 edition of The Space Gamer (Issue No. 60), Russell Grant Collins did not recommend the game, saying, "If the idea of a FRPG set in the days of the Roman Empire intrigues you, I'd recommend you create one yourself, using whatever system you like best. If Yaquinto lowered the price... then I could recommend this game; but as it is, it's not worth it."

In the May 1983 edition of White Dwarf (issue #41), Marcus Rowland reviewed this game along with two published adventures: Adventure 1, Episode 5 - Death to Setanta and Adventure 1, Episode 6 - The Kingdom of the Sidhe. Rowland found the rules disorganized, relevant material hard to locate, and the game system too simplistic to be interesting. He gave the game and the adventures below average ratings of 5/10, 4/10 and 6/10 respectively.

In the December 1983 edition of Dragon Magazine (Issue #80), Ken Rolston found "the poor game design and wordy style make the game unpleasant reading, comparing unfavorably with most other published FRP game systems." Rolston liked the idea of exploring Earth's history, but found that the game couldn't decide whether it wanted to be historically accurate, or a fantasy. "Anyone who mistakenly buys the game expecting historical accuracy or simulation will be disappointed. It is not that there is no history at all in the game; to the contrary, there is a great deal of historically accurate material about the men, myths, and magicks of ancient Earth. The problem is that there are too many distracting anachronisms and fabrications (like a tyrannosaurus in Rome) to take the historical material seriously." Rolston concluded with a thumbs down: "I've found no other system as disappointing... I cannot even recommend the game as an ambitious failure — there is little new or unconventional in the systems or design."

In the 2014 retrospective book Designers & Dragons: The 80s, Shannon Appelcline noted that despite the bad reviews, this game was noteworthy as "the earliest notable RPG to really take a solid look at historical roleplaying." Applecline also pointed out that Man, Myth, & Magic was "one of the earliest RPGs to provide truly serialized adventures" and that "Man, Myth & Magic went further, providing tighter connections between adventures, and even cliffhangers at the end of each supplement".

Reviews
Different Worlds #25 (Oct./Nov., 1982)

Released products 

 4306 - Man, Myth & Magic (1982, Boxed Set - Includes items 4300-4305)
 4300 - Dice
 4301 - Book 1 - Basic Rules Book
 4302 - Book 2 - Advanced Rules Book
 4303 - Book 3 - The Adventures Book (Begins campaign with Adventure 1, Episodes 1-4)
 4304 - Character Pad
 4305 - Adventure Maps
 4307 - Adventure 1, Episode 5 - Death to Setanta
 4308 - Adventure 1, Episode 6 - Kingdom of the Sidhe
 4309 - Adventure 1, Episode 7 - Newgrange Reactivated
 4310 - Adventure 1, Episode 8 - Glastonbury Labyrinth
 4311 - Adventure 1, Episode 9 - Ascent to Hell (Final episode)
 4312 - Adventure 2 - The Egyptian Trilogy (3 episode, standalone adventure)
 4313 - Adventure 3 - Werewolf of Europe (1 episode, standalone adventure)
 4314 - Adventure 4 - Norse Trilogy (never published)

Re-release
Precis Intermedia Gaming re-released Man, Myth & Magic in PDF format on DriveThruRPG on June 21, 2019.

References

External links
RPG Encyclopedia entry

Fantasy role-playing games
Yaquinto Publications games
Role-playing games introduced in 1982
Role-playing game systems